Ernest James Watts (born October 23, 1945) is an American jazz and rhythm and blues saxophonist who plays soprano, alto, and tenor saxophone. He has worked with Charlie Haden's Quartet West and toured with the Rolling Stones. On Frank Zappa's album The Grand Wazoo he played the "Mystery Horn", a straight-necked C melody saxophone. He played the notable saxophone riff on "The One You Love" by Glenn Frey.

Biography

Watts was born in Norfolk, Virginia, and began playing saxophone at thirteen. After a brief period at West Chester University, he attended the Berklee College of Music on a Down Beat magazine scholarship. He toured with Buddy Rich in the late-1960s, occupying one of the alto saxophone chairs. He visited Africa on a U.S. State Department tour with Oliver Nelson's group. For twenty years he played alto saxophone with The Tonight Show Band under Doc Severinsen. He was a featured soloist on many of Marvin Gaye's albums on Motown during the 1970s, as well as on many other pop and R&B sessions during his twenty-five years as a studio musician in Los Angeles. He has won two Grammy Awards as an instrumentalist.

In the mid-1980s Watts decided to rededicate himself to jazz. He recorded and toured with German guitarist and composer Torsten de Winkel, drummer Steve Smith, and keyboardist Tom Coster. He was invited to join Charlie Haden's Quartet West. They met backstage one night after Haden heard Watts play "Nightbird" by Michel Colombier. Watts played on soundtracks for the movies Grease and  The Color Purple and on the theme song for the TV show Night Court.

In 1982, his version of "Chariots of Fire" was featured in the Season 4 episode of WKRP in Cincinnati ("The Creation of Venus") as Andy Travis and Venus Flytrap are playing games in the studio when Momma Carlson walks in and surprises them.

He was featured in one of Windows XP's sample music, "Highway Blues" by New Stories.
In 1986, he visited South America with the Pat Metheny Special Quartet, alongside Charlie Haden and Paul Wertico, playing at Shams in Buenos Aires, Argentina.

In 2008, his album Analog Man won the Independent Music Award for Best Jazz Album. He played on Kurt Elling's album Dedicated to You, which won the Grammy Award for Best Jazz Vocal Album in 2011.

Discography

As leader

 Planet Love (Pacific Jazz, 1969)
 The Wonder Bag (Vault, 1972)
 Look in Your Heart (Elektra, 1980)
 Chariots of Fire (Qwest, 1982)
 Musician (Qwest, 1985)
 Sanctuary (Qwest, 1986)
 The Ernie Watts Quartet (JVC, 1987 [1991])
 Afoxe with Gilberto Gil (CTI, 1991)
 Reaching Up (JVC, 1994)
 Unity (JVC, 1995)
 Long Road Home (JVC, 1996)
 Classic Moods (JVC, 1998)
 Reflections with Ron Feuer (Flying Dolphin, 2000)
 Alive (Flying Dolphin, 2004)
 Spirit Song (Flying Dolphin, 2005)
 Analog Man (Flying Dolphin, 2006)
 To The Point (Flying Dolphin, 2007)
 Four Plus Four (Flying Dolphin, 2009)
 Oasis (Flying Dolphin, 2011)
 A Simple Truth (Flying Dolphin, 2014)
 Wheel of Time (Flying Dolphin, 2016)
 Home Light (Flying Dolphin, 2018)

With Karma
Celebration (Horizon/A&M, 1976)
For Everybody (Horizon/A&M, 1977)

As sideman

With the GRP All-Star Big Band
 GRP All-Star Big Band (GRP, 1992)
 Dave Grusin Presents the GRP All-Star Big Band Live!, (GRP, 1993)
 All Blues, (GRP, 1995)
With Jean-Luc Ponty
King Kong: Jean-Luc Ponty Plays the Music of Frank Zappa (World Pacific/Liberty,1970)
With Steely Dan
Countdown to Ecstasy (ABC Records, 1973)
With Gamalon
Project: Activation Earth (Amherst Records, Inc.,1989)
With Billy Alessi and Bobby Alessi
 Words and Music (A&M, 1979)
 Long Time Friends (Qwest, 1982)
With Gene Ammons
 Free Again (Prestige, 1971)
With Paul Anka
 The Music Man (United Artists, 1977)
 Walk a Fine Line (CBS, 1983)
With Willie Bobo
 Tomorrow Is Here (1977)
With Brass Fever
 Time Is Running Out (Impulse!, 1976) 
With Kenny Burrell
 Both Feet on the Ground (Fantasy, 1973)
With Donald Byrd
 Donald Byrd and 125th Street, N.Y.C. (Elektra, 1979)
With Jennifer Holliday
 Get Close to My Love (Geffen, 1987)
With Dion DiMucci
 Streetheart (Warner Bros., 1976)
With Lee Ritenour
 Friendship (JASRAC, 1979)
 Stolen Moments (GRP, 1989)
With David Axelrod
 Earth Rot (Capitol, 1970)
With Donald Byrd
 Caricatures (Blue Note, 1976)
With Joe Cocker
 Have a Little Faith (550 Music, 1994)
With Boz Scaggs
 Slow Dancer (Columbia Records, 1974)
 Down Two Then Left (Columbia Records, 1977)
With Stanley Clarke
 Time Exposure (CBS, 1984)
With Gloria Gaynor
 Stories (Polydor, 1980)
With Sarah Vaughan
 Brazilian Romance (CBS, 1987)
With Aaron Neville
 The Grand Tour (A&M Records, 1993)
With Bill Withers
 Making Music (Columbia, 1975)
 Watching You Watching Me (Columbia, 1985)
With Natalie Cole
 Don't Look Back (Capitol, 1980)
With Randy Crawford
 Secret Combination (Warner Bros. Records, 1981)
With James Taylor
 In the Pocket (Rhino Records, 1976)
With Rickie Lee Jones
 Rickie Lee Jones (Warner Bros., 1979)
With Paul McCartney
 Pipes of Peace (Parlophone Records, 1983)
With Kurt Elling
 Dedicated to You: Kurt Elling Sings the Music of Coltrane and Hartman (Concord, 2009)
With Patti Austin
 Patti Austin (Qwest Records, 1984)
 The Real Me (Qwest Records, 1988)
 Love Is Gonna Getcha (GRP, 1990)
With Dionne Warwick
 Love at First Sight (Warner Bros. Records, 1977)
With Bob Seger
 Like a Rock (Capitol Records, 1986)
With Deniece Williams
 This Is Niecy (Columbia, 1976)
 I'm So Proud (Columbia, 1983)
With Marvin Gaye
 Let's Get It On (Tamla, 1973)
 I Want You (Tamla, 1976)
With Christopher Cross
 Another Page (Warner Bros., 1983)
 Arthur's Theme (Best That You Can Do) (Arthur - The Album. Warner Bros., 1981)
With Maria Muldaur
 Southern Winds (Warner Bros., 1978)
With Dizzy Gillespie
 Free Ride (Pablo, 1977)
With Gino Vannelli
 Brother to Brother (A&M Records, 1978)
With Benny Golson
 Killer Joe (Columbia, 1977)
With Aretha Franklin
 You (Atlantic, 1975)
With Michael Franks
 Burchfield Nines (Warner Bros., 1978)
With Bonnie Raitt
 Takin' My Time (Warner Bros., 1973)
With Cheryl Lynn
 Cheryl Lynn (Columbia Records, 1978)
With Charlie Haden
 Quartet West (Verve, 1987)
 The Private Collection (Naim, 1987–88 [2000])
 In Angel City (Verve, 1988)
 The Montreal Tapes: Liberation Music Orchestra (Verve, 1989 [1999])
 Haunted Heart (Verve, 1992)
 Always Say Goodbye (Verve, 1994)
 Now Is the Hour (Verve, 1996)
 The Art of the Song (Verve, 1999)
 Sophisticated Ladies (EmArcy, 2010)
With Betty Wright
 Betty Wright (Epic Records, 1981)
 Wright Back At You (Epic Records, 1983)
With Cher
 Take Me Home (Casablanca, 1979)
With Frankie Valli
 Valli (Private Stock, 1976)
 Frankie Valli... Is the Word (Warner Bros., 1978)
With Bobby Hutcherson
 Head On (Blue Note, 1971)
 Linger Lane (Blue Note, 1975)
 Montara (Blue Note, 1975)
With Milt Jackson
 Memphis Jackson (Impulse!, 1969)
With Barbra Streisand
 Songbird (Columbia, 1978)
With Jim Messina
 One More Mile (Warner Bros., 1983)
With Peabo Bryson and Natalie Cole
 We're the Best of Friends (Capitol Records, 1979)
With Willis Alan Ramsey
 Willis Alan Ramsey (Shelter, 1972)
With J. J. Johnson
 Concepts in Blue (Pablo Today, 1981)
With Teena Marie
 Wild and Peaceful (Gordy, 1979)
 Roobery (Epic, 1983)
 Starchild (Epic, 1984)
With Quincy Jones
 Roots (A&M, 1977)
With Jeffrey Osborne
 Jeffrey Osborne (A&M, 1982)
With Carole King
 Music (Ode, 1971)
 Rhymes & Reasons (Ode, 1972)
 Fantasy (Ode, 1973)
 Wrap Around Joy (Ode, 1974)
 Simple Things (Capitol, 1977)
 Welcome Home (Capitol, 1978)
With Glenn Frey
 No Fun Aloud (Asylum Records, 1982)
With Charles Kynard
 Charles Kynard (Mainstream, 1971)
With Eric Martin
 Eric Martin (Capitol, 1985)
With John Mayall
 Moving On (Polydor, 1973)
With Randy Newman
 Trouble in Paradise (Reprise Records, 1983)
With Carmen McRae
 Can't Hide Love (Blue Note, 1976)
With Blue Mitchell
 Vital Blue (Mainstream, 1971)
With Helen Reddy
 Reddy (Capitol, 1979)
With New Stories
 Speakin' Out (1999)
With Moacir Santos
 Carnival of the Spirits (Blue Note, 1975)
With Lalo Schifrin
 Gypsies (Tabu, 1978) 
 No One Home (Tabu, 1979)
With Bud Shank
 Windmills of Your Mind (Pacific Jazz, 1969)
With Donna Summer
Donna Summer (Geffen, 1982)
With Rob Mullins
Tokyo Nights (Nova, 1990)
With the Super Black Blues Band: T-Bone Walker, Otis Spann and Joe Turner
Super Black Blues (BluesTime, 1969)
With Gábor Szabó
 Faces (Mercury, 1977)
With Mariya Takeuchi
 Variety (Moon Records, 1984)
With Gino Vannelli 
 Brother to Brother (A&M, 1978)
With Gerald Wilson
 Eternal Equinox (Pacific Jazz, 1969)
 Lomelin (Discovery, 1981)
 Jessica (Trend, 1982)
 Calafia (Trend, 1985)
With Torsten de Winkel and Hellmut Hattler
 Mastertouch (EMI, 1985)
With Rufus and Chaka Khan
 Stompin' at the Savoy – Live (Warner Bros. Records, 1983)
With Paul Clark
 Aim for the Heart (Seed Records, 1980)

References

External links

Ernie Watts Interview NAMM Oral History Library (2020)
 

1945 births
Living people
American jazz saxophonists
American male saxophonists
American jazz flautists
Berklee College of Music alumni
Musicians from Norfolk, Virginia
Mainstream Records artists
Grammy Award winners
Qwest Records artists
Independent Music Awards winners
21st-century American saxophonists
Jazz musicians from Virginia
21st-century American male musicians
American male jazz musicians
GRP All-Star Big Band members
The Tonight Show Band members
Karma (American band) members
CTI Records artists
Elektra Records artists
JVC Records artists
The Love Unlimited Orchestra members
21st-century flautists